N56 may refer to:

Roads 
 N56 road (Belgium)
 Route nationale 56, in France
 N56 road (Ireland)
 Nebraska Highway 56, in the United States

Other uses 
 N-56 (pressure group) a Scottish pressure group
 Great Valley Airport, in Cattaraugus County, New York, United States
 , a Grampus-class submarine of the Royal Navy sunk in 1940
 , a U-class submarine of the Royal Navy sunk in 1941